The Elisha Straight House, now the Hartford Museum, is located on Main Street in Hartford, New York, United States, a short distance north of NY 149. It is a red wooden house dating to the early 19th century.

At the beginning of the Civil War it was used as a local recruitment center for the Union Army, since many local men wanted to serve due to strong abolitionist sentiment in the area. Today it is a local history museum. In 2004 it was listed on the National Register of Historic Places.

See also
National Register of Historic Places listings in Washington County, New York

External links
Hartford Museum - Town of Hartford listing

Houses on the National Register of Historic Places in New York (state)
Museums in Washington County, New York
History museums in New York (state)
Historical society museums in New York (state)
Houses in Washington County, New York
National Register of Historic Places in Washington County, New York